Ellen Forde Hansell Allerdice (née Hansell; September 18, 1869,  – May 11, 1937) was an American female tennis player. She was the first women's singles champion of the U.S. Championships in 1887. She was a losing finalist to Bertha Townsend the next year.

Early life and tennis
Hansell was born on September 18, 1869 in Philadelphia, the daughter of Samuel Rob Hansell, an upholstery manufacturer, and Jane Martin. She battled anemia as a child and started playing tennis on advice of her doctor. She joined the Belmont Club in Philadelphia when she was 16 where she played with Margarette Ballard and Bertha Townsend.

U.S. Women's National Singles Championship 
In 1887, Hansell took part in the inaugural U.S. Women's National Singles Championship. The event was played on the outdoor grass courts of the Philadelphia Cricket Club and started on 27 September. She was one of seven contestants who came from the greater Delaware Valley area. Hansell, playing in a full, over-draped skirt with long sleeves and her customary red hat, won her opening round against Jessie Harding while losing just one game. In the semifinals, she lost the first set against Helen Day Harris, but won the match in three sets. The final against Laura Knight was a one-sided affair, which Hansell won in straight sets to become the first U.S. women's champion. According to a report she "employed sidearm serves, sliced ground strokes and never, but never went to the net".

The tournament used a challenge system whereby the defending champion automatically qualified for the next year's final in which she would play the winner of the all-comers tournament. This meant that Hansell did not have to play through the 1888 tournament and only had to play the challenge round. She played Bertha Townsend, who had won the all-comer's event against Marion Wright in the final, and Townsend won the match in straight sets.

Hansell did not win another tournament and retired from the game in 1890. She married Taylor Allerdice, and the couple had six children. Hansell was inducted into the International Tennis Hall of Fame in 1965.

Grand Slam finals

Singles (1 title, 1 runner-up)

Notes

References

External links
 

1869 births
1937 deaths
American female tennis players
Tennis players from Philadelphia
International Tennis Hall of Fame inductees
United States National champions (tennis)
Grand Slam (tennis) champions in women's singles